BufferGel is the brand name of a spermicide and microbicide gel which is being tested for its potential development into a preventive medicine to stop the transmission of HIV.

Testing
In macaques, after BufferGel's effect on microflora and pH were measured by vaginal colposcopy and rectal lavage researchers determined that it fit the safety profile of a drug which could be tested on humans.

A phase I clinical trial done on women in India, Thailand gave supporting evidence that users tolerate the drug well.  A similar trial in the United States also showed drug tolerance.

References

External links
Manufacturer's product page 

Microbicides
Spermicide